Events from the year 1973 in the United Kingdom.

Incumbents
 Monarch – Elizabeth II
 Prime Minister – Edward Heath (Conservative)
 Parliament – 45th

Events

January
 1 January – The United Kingdom, the Republic of Ireland and Denmark entered the European Economic Community.
 4 January – 300 children attacked British Army troops in Derry, Northern Ireland.
 11 January – The Open University awarded its first degrees.
 18 January – Eleven Labour Party councillors in Clay Cross, Derbyshire, England, are ordered to pay £6,985 for not enforcing the Housing Finance Act.
 19 January – The super tug Statesman was sent to protect British fishing vessels from Icelandic action in the Cod War.
 22 January – British share values fell by £4,000,000,000 in one day.
 25 January – English actor Derren Nesbitt is convicted of assaulting his wife Anne Aubrey.

February
 16 February – The Court of Appeal of England and Wales rules that The Sunday Times can publish articles on thalidomide and Distillers Company, despite ongoing legal actions by parents (the decision is overturned in July by the House of Lords).
 20 February – Two Pakistanis were shot dead by police in London after being found in the Indian High Commission carrying pistols, which were later established to have been fake.
 26 February – Edward Heath's British government publishes a Green Paper on prices and incomes policy.
 27 February – Rail workers and civil servants went on strike.

March
 1 March – Dick Taverne, having resigned from the Parliament of the United Kingdom on leaving the Labour Party, is re-elected as a 'Democratic Labour' candidate.
 3 March 
 Two IRA bombs explode in London, killing one person and injuring 250 others. Ten people are arrested hours later at Heathrow Airport on suspicion of being involved in the bombings.
 Tottenham Hotspur wins the Football League Cup final at Wembley, beating Norwich City 1–0.
 8 March
 Northern Ireland sovereignty referendum (the "Border Poll"): 98.9% of those voting in the province want Northern Ireland to remain within the UK. Turnout was 58.7%, although less than 1% for Catholics. This was the first referendum on regional government in the UK.
 IRA bombs explode in Whitehall and the Old Bailey in London.
 10 March – The governor of Bermuda, Richard Sharples, and his aide-de-camp are assassinated.
 17 March – Elizabeth II opens the replacement London Bridge.
 21 March – Seven men are killed in the Lofthouse Colliery disaster in Yorkshire.
 24 March – Pink Floyd's The Dark Side of the Moon, one of rock's landmark albums, is released in the UK.
 26 March – Women are admitted into the London Stock Exchange for the first time.

April
 1 April
 Value-added tax (VAT) comes into effect in the UK.
 Phase 2 of the Price and Pay Code came into effect, restricting rises in pay and prices as a counter-inflation measure.
 6 April – Peter Niesewand, a correspondent of The Guardian newspaper and the BBC, is jailed in Rhodesia for an alleged breach of the Official Secrets Act.
 11 April – The House of Commons votes against restoring capital punishment by a margin of 142 votes.
 12 April – The Labour Party wins control of the Greater London Council.
 17 April – British Leyland launches its new Austin Allegro, a range of two and four door family saloons which would eventually replace the long-running 1100 and 1300 models, which were set to continue in production alongside the Allegro until 1974.
 28 April – Liverpool and Celtic F.C. are crowned league champions of football in England and Scotland respectively.

May
 1 May – 1.6 million workers go on strike over government pay restraints.
 5 May–28 July – A BBC Television series The Ascent of Man, written and presented by Jacob Bronowski, aired – there was also an accompanying best-selling book.
 5 May – Sunderland A.F.C. achieve a shock 1–0 win over Leeds United in the FA Cup final at Wembley. Ian Porterfield scores the only goal of the game. It is the first time that an FA Cup winning team had not contained a single player to be capped at full international level, and the first postwar FA Cup won by a side outside the First Division.
 10 May – The Liberal Party gains control of Liverpool council in the local council elections.
 14 May – The British House of Commons votes to abolish capital punishment in Northern Ireland.
 15 May – In the House of Commons, Prime Minister Edward Heath, describes large payments made by Lonrho to Duncan Sandys through the tax haven of the Cayman Islands at a time when the government was trying to implement a counter-inflation policy as the "unacceptable face of capitalism".
 20 May – The Royal Navy sends three frigates to protect British fishing vessels from Icelandic action in the Cod War dispute.
 22 May – Lord Lambton resigns from the government over a 'call girl' scandal.
 23 May – The Matrimonial Causes Act amends the law of divorce in England and Wales.
 24 May – Earl Jellicoe, Lord Privy Seal and Leader of the House of Lords, resigns over a separate prostitution scandal.
 29 May – The Princess Royal announced her engagement to Mark Phillips.

June
 6 June – St Mary's Church, Putney in London was gutted by fire, later revealed to be arson.
 23 June – A fire at a house in Hull which killed a six-year-old boy was initially thought to be an accident but later emerged as the first of 26 fire deaths caused over the next seven years by arsonist Peter Dinsdale.

July
 1 July – The British Library is established by merger of the British Museum Library in London and the National Lending Library for Science and Technology at Boston Spa in Yorkshire.
 5 July – The Isle of Man Post begins to issue its own postage stamps.
 6 July – The eighth James Bond film – Live and Let Die – is released in British cinemas, with the spy being played for the first time by 45-year-old The Saint star Roger Moore.
 10 July – The Bahamas gain full independence within the Commonwealth of Nations.
 26 July – Parliamentary by-elections at the Isle of Ely and Ripon result in both seats being gained from the Conservatives by the Liberal Party candidates, media personality Clement Freud and David Austick respectively.
 30 July
 Markham Colliery disaster: Eighteen coal miners are killed at the coal mine near Staveley, Derbyshire, when the brake mechanism on their cage failed.
 £20,000,000 compensation is paid to victims of Thalidomide following an eleven-year court case.
 31 July – Militant protesters of Ian Paisley disrupt the first sitting of the Northern Ireland Assembly.

August
 8 August – Gordon Banks, the Stoke City and England goalkeeper, announces his retirement from football having lost the sight in one eye in a car crash in October last year.
 20 August – Football League president Len Shipman calls for the government to bring back the birch as a tactic of dealing with the growing problem of football hooliganism.
 21 August – The coroner in the Bloody Sunday inquest accuses the British army of "sheer unadulterated murder" after the jury returned an open verdict.

September
 3 September – The Trades Union Congress expels 20 members for registering under the Industrial Relations Act 1971.
 8 September – The IRA detonates bombs in Manchester and at London Victoria station.
 10 September
 IRA bombs at King's Cross and Euston railway stations in London injure 13 people.
 The fashion store Biba reopens in Kensington High Street.
 12 September – Further IRA bombs explode in Oxford Street and Sloane Square.
 28 September – The Somerset Coalfield is last worked (at Lower Writhlington near Radstock).

October
 8 October
 London Broadcasting Company, Britain's first legal commercial Independent Local Radio station, begins broadcasting.
 Prime Minister Edward Heath announces government proposals for its counter-inflationary Price and Pay Code Stage Three (continuing to July 1974), including limiting pay rises to 7%, restricting price rises, and paying a £10 Christmas bonus to pensioners – a move which would cost around £80,000,000 funded by a 9p rise in National Insurance contributions.
 16 October
 The film Don't Look Now, containing one of the most graphic sex scenes hitherto shown in mainstream British cinema, is released in a double bill with The Wicker Man.
 Capital Radio, Britain's first legal music-themed commercial Independent Local Radio station, began broadcasting in London.
 20 October – The Dalai Lama made his first visit to the UK.
 26 October – Firefighters in Glasgow stage a one-day strike as part of a pay dispute; troops were drafted in to run the fire stations.
 31 October – The sixth series of BBC television sitcom Dad's Army opens with the episode "The Deadly Attachment" containing the "Don't tell him, Pike!" exchange which would become rated as one of the top three greatest comedy moments of British television.

November
 8 November
 The Second Cod War between Britain and Iceland ended.
 The government made £146,000,000 compensation available to three nationalised industries to cover losses resulting from the price restraint policies.
 12 November
 Miners began overtime ban; ambulance drivers began selective strikes.
 Television sitcom Last of the Summer Wine began its first series run on BBC One, following a premiere in Comedy Playhouse on 4 January. It would run for 31 series spanning 37 years.
 14 November
 Eight members of the Provisional IRA were convicted of the March bombings in London.
 The Princess Royal marries Captain Mark Phillips at Westminster Abbey.
 26 November – Peter Walker, the Secretary for Trade and Industry, warned that petrol rationing may have to be introduced in the near future as a result of the oil crisis in the Middle East which was restricting petrol supply.
 November – Unemployment in the United Kingdom reached a low of 3.4%; it went no lower for at least 40 years.

December
 5 December – The speed limit on all roads including motorways was reduced to 50 mph from 70 mph until further notice as a result of the oil crisis.
 9 December – The Sunningdale Agreement was signed in Sunningdale, Berkshire by Prime Minister Edward Heath, Irish premier Liam Cosgrave, and representatives of the Ulster Unionist Party, the Social Democratic and Labour Party and the Alliance Party of Northern Ireland.
 10 December
 Brian Josephson shared the Nobel Prize in Physics "for his theoretical predictions of the properties of a supercurrent through a tunnel barrier, in particular those phenomena which are generally known as the Josephson effects".
 Geoffrey Wilkinson wins the Nobel Prize in Chemistry jointly with Ernst Otto Fischer "for their pioneering work, performed independently, on the chemistry of the organometallic, so called sandwich compounds".
 19 December – Ealing rail crash: The 17.18 Paddington to Oxford express train is derailed between Ealing Broadway and West Ealing due to a locomotive maintenance error resulting in 10 dead and 94 injured.
 31 December – Coal shortages caused by industrial action result in the implementation of the Three-Day Week electricity consumption reduction measure.

Undated
 Inflation rises to 8.4%.
 Total fertility rate (average number of births per woman over her reproductive life) falls to 2.04, giving sub-replacement fertility for the UK.
 Start of Secondary banking crisis of 1973–1975.
 Darul Uloom Bury, the UK's oldest Islamic seminary, is established.
 The Vindolanda tablets are discovered by Robin Birley near Hadrian's Wall.
 Pizza Hut opens its first UK restaurant, in Islington.
 The National House Building Council is formed .
 Death of last pure-bred Norfolk Horn ram.

Publications
 Martin Amis's novel The Rachel Papers.
 Agatha Christie's novel Postern of Fate.
 J. G. Farrell's novel The Siege of Krishnapur.
 Graham Greene's novel The Honorary Consul.
 B. S. Johnson's novel Christie Malry's Own Double-Entry.
 Iris Murdoch's novel The Black Prince.

Births

January–March
 1 January – Jimi Mistry, actor
 18 January 
 Crispian Mills, musician (The Jeevas and Kula Shaker)
 Ben Willbond, actor and screenwriter
 29 January – Miranda Krestovnikoff, née Harper-Jones, archaeologist and television host
 7 February – Kate Thornton, television presenter
 8 February – Sonia Deol, presenter
 13 February – Ian Duncan, Baron Duncan of Springbank, English politician
 27 February – Peter Andre, singer
 2 March – Trevor Sinclair, football player and commentator
 3 March – Matthew Marsden, actor and martial artist
 4 March – Penny Mordaunt, politician
 10 March –  Chris Sutton, football player and commentator
 28 March – Scott Mills, radio disc jockey

April–June 
 1 April – Kris Marshall, actor
 2 April – Simon Farnaby, actor, writer and comedian 
 3 April – Jamie Bamber, actor
 7 April – Christian O'Connell, radio DJ and presenter
 11 April – Amanda Staveley, business executive
 21 April
 Steve Backshall, naturalist, writer and television presenter 
 Mark Dexter, actor
 24 April – Gabby Logan, sports presenter
 26 April – Geoff Lloyd, radio host
 26 April – Chris Perry, English footballer
 8 May 
 Marcus Brigstocke, British comedian
 Paul Warne, English football player and manager
 10 May 
 Gareth Ainsworth, English footballer
 Dario Franchitti, Scottish racing driver
 14 May – Fraser Nelson, political journalist
 17 May – Tamsier Joof Aviance, dancer, choreographer and entrepreneur (of Senegalese and Gambian descent) 
 19 May – Dario Franchitti, Scottish racing driver and commentator
 21 May – Noel Fielding, English comedian
 24 May 
 Dermot O'Leary, British television presenter
 Matthew Rudd, British radio presenter
 28 May – Nathan Jones, Welsh football player and manager
 30 May – Leigh Francis, British comedian
 9 June – Iain Lee, British comedian and radio and television presenter
 24 June – Charles Venn, English actor
 25 June – Jamie Redknapp, English footballer
 27 June 
 Razaaq Adoti, actor, producer and screenwriter
 Tom Tugendhat, English politician

July–September
 2 July – Peter Kay, comedian
 3 July – Emma Cunniffe, actress
 6 July – Bradley Dredge, golfer
 8 July – Viv Groskop, journalist and comedian
 10 July
 Neil Bannister, English cricketer
 Craig Heap, English gymnast
 19 July – Wayne Rigby, British boxer
 23 July – Fran Healy, singer (Travis)
 25 July
 Dani Filth, vocalist
 Kevin Phillips, English footballer
 26 July – Kate Beckinsale, actress
 28 July (possible date) – Banksy, graffiti artist
 3 August – Stephen Graham, actor 
 6 August – Iain Morris, screenwriter and producer
 12 August – Richard Reid, terrorist
 20 August – Stephen Nolan, Northern Irish radio presenter
 24 August – Dave Brown, English comedian
 5 September – Paddy Considine, actor
 12 September – Darren Campbell, athlete
 15 September – Julie Cox, English actress
 20 September – Jason MacIntyre, Scottish racing cyclist (died 2008)

October–December
 3 October
 Richard Ian Cox, Welsh-Canadian voice actor and radio host
 Grace Dent, English journalist and broadcaster
 21 October – Beverley Turner, British television and radio presenter
 10 November – Jacqui Abbott, English singer 
 29 November – Ryan Giggs, Welsh footballer
 1 December – Kieron Durkan, English-born Irish footballer (died 2018)
 4 December – Michael Jackson, English football defender and manager
 17 December – Paula Radcliffe, British athlete
 18 December – Lucy Worsley, English historian
 24 December
 Paul Foot, English comedian
 Matt Tebbutt, British television presenter and chef

Undated
 Katie Carr, actress and model
 Frances Hardinge, young adult fiction writer

Deaths

January–March
 15 January – Neil M. Gunn, Scottish novelist, critic, and dramatist (born 1891)
 19 January – Max Adrian, Northern Irish actor (born 1903)
 28 January – Francis Romney, English cricketer (born 1873)
 16 February – Harold Gibbons, English cricketer (born 1904)
 22 February – Elizabeth Bowen, novelist (born 1899)
 12 March – David Lack, British ornithologist and biologist (born 1910)
 26 March – Noël Coward, English composer and playwright (born 1899)
 30 March – Douglas Douglas-Hamilton, 14th Duke of Hamilton, British politician and Conservative peer (born 1903)

April–June
 9 May – Owen Brannigan, English singer (born 1908)
 11 May – Russell Everitt, English cricketer (born 1881)
 14 May – A. C. Ewing, British philosopher (born 1899)
 21 May – Montague Dawson, English maritime painter (born 1890)
 6 June – Jimmy Clitheroe, aka 'The Clitheroe Kid', English comedian (born 1921)
 18 June – Roger Delgado, English actor (Doctor Who) (born 1918)

July–September
 1 July – Charles Ernest Garforth, English soldier and recipient of the Victoria Cross (born 1891)
 8 July – Wilfred Rhodes, English cricketer (born 1877)
 18 July
 John Brown Hamilton, Scottish soldier and recipient of the Victoria Cross (born 1896)
 Jack Hawkins, English actor (The Cruel Sea) (born 1910)
 29 July – Roger Williamson, British race car driver (born 1948)
 6 August – James Beck, actor (born 1929)
 15 August – Edward Turner, English motorcycle designer (born 1901)
 16 August – A. K. Chesterton, South African-born far-right politician and journalist (born 1896)
 17 August – George Benson, British Labour Party politician (born 1889)
 18 August – Basil Brooke, 1st Viscount Brookeborough, British Ulster Unionist politician (born 1888)
 29 August – Stringer Davis, English actor (born 1896)
 2 September – J. R. R. Tolkien, British writer (born 1892)
 6 September – William Henry Harris, English organist and composer (born 1883)
 9 September – Bill Doran, English motorcycle road racer (born 1916)
 11 September – E. E. Evans-Pritchard, British anthropologist (born 1902)
 20 September – William Plomer, South African-born novelist, poet and literary editor (born 1903)
 21 September – C. H. Dodd, Welsh scholar and theologian (born 1884)
 24 September – Barbara Freyberg, Baroness Freyberg, British peeress
 25 September – George Porter, British Labour Party politician (born 1884)
 29 September – W. H. Auden, British-American poet, died in Austria (born 1907)

October–December
 4 October – Walter Montagu Douglas Scott, 8th Duke of Buccleuch, British politician and Conservative peer (born 1894)
 6 October – Dennis Price, actor (born 1915)
 9 October – Hilda Plowright, English actress (born 1890)
 25 October – Sir William Whitworth, admiral (born 1884)
 10 November – Gerald Cock, British broadcasting executive (born 1887)
 21 November – Sir Roy Fedden, English aircraft engine designer (born 1885)
 5 December – Sir Robert Watson-Watt, Scottish inventor (born 1892)
 9 December – Anthony Gilbert (pen name of Lucy Beatrice Malleson), British crime fiction writer (born 1899)
 13 December – Henry Green, novelist (born 1905)

See also
 1973 in British music
 1973 in British television
 List of British films of 1973

References

 
Years of the 20th century in the United Kingdom